Karma is an American competitive children's web series hosted by Michelle Khare. It premiered on HBO Max on June 18, 2020. For unknown reasons, the show was taken down from HBO Max on September 1, 2020 and now is not currently available to view.

Production
Produced by GoodStory Entertainment, Karma was co-created by actor and children's game show presenter J. D. Roth and music producer Scooter Braun. It was announced on October 9, 2019 that HBO Max had picked up the show with Michelle Khare as host with an anticipated June 2020 release date.

The contests

The laws of Karma 
Each team selects a law of Karma and a color to represent it. These laws are given in the form of a medallion representing each law. The eight laws of Karma in Season One were:

 Inspiration
 Connection
 Patience
 Giving
 Humility
 Growth
 Focus 
 Responsibility

Once eliminated, players had their medallions given to one of the remaining teams.

Karma Coins 
After the team that won the challenge selects two teams to send to the Cave of Karma, the remaining teams each receive a Karma Coin. They will give these Karma coins to one of the two teams chosen to go to the Cave at the offering. At the offering, each of the safe teams, excluding the team that won the challenge, come up one at a time and hand their team's coin to the team that they wanted to help at the Cave. The coins play a role in the cave, and having more coins would give the teams more opportunities to survive the Cave.

The Cave of Karma 
The winning team of the challenge would get to select two teams to send to the Cave of Karma, where they would face off in a challenge which would eliminate one team. The challenge at the Cave was to find one (or more) Karma Coin(s) given to them. The coins were hidden by the opposing team under one of the 10 stone chambers that were on each side. After the hiding of the coins, each team would take turns to find their coin(s) by smashing open one of the chambers. The first team to find that Cave's amount of coins would win and return to the game.

Season summaries

Season 1 - Karma (2020)

The season consisted of eight teams (in order of elimination):

Elimination table

Key
  The team won the Final Cave Challenge and became “Karma” Champions.
 The team lost the Final Cave Challenge and were the runners-up.
 The contestant won the team selection challenge and created all the teams of Karma.
 The team won the Team Challenge and sent two other teams to the Cave of Karma.
 The contestant won Laws of Karma at a challenge.
 The team did not win the challenge, but was safe from going to the Cave of Karma.
 The team won at the Cave of Karma and avoided elimination.
 The team lost at the Cave of Karma and was eliminated.
 The contestant was eliminated at the Right to Stay.
 The contestant withdrew from the competition.

Offering Summary 

*Blue team offered Gray team one regular Karma coin, plus an extra Karma coin they won in the "Tlit" team challenge.

**In the Final, the eliminated teams offered clues instead of coins to the final two teams. These clues would help them in the final Cave of Karma.

WIN: The team won the challenge. Since they nominated two team to go to The Cave of Karma, they will not make an offering.

CAVE: The team was sent to go to The Cave of Karma.

FINALIST: The team is a Karma finalist.

Cave of Karma Matches

Trivia 

 The Yellow team was the only team to not only go to The Cave of Karma three times, but also go back-to-back three times.
 Red team had won three team challenges (Ring My Bell, Pull it Up, I've got it in the Bag), which makes them the team with most team challenge wins. Closely followed by Pink team with two wins (Fill and Spill, Head Strong).
 Yellow team had won two Cave of Karma matches, which makes them the team with the most Cave of Karma wins. Gray, Blue, Red and Purple are all tied with one win.
 Yellow team had the highest amount of Karma Coins offered to them will a total of seven coins.
 According to the Rob has a Podcast Karma recap for episode 2, in the Green vs Yellow Cave of Karma match up, Green team found their one coin on the first swing. Yellow team also found one of their coins, which caused a reset. This was not shown in the episode.
 The Purple team and Pink team got offered a total of 4 medallions each, which makes them the teams with the most medallions offered to them by another team. (Pink was offered 4 medallions, all from Yellow team. Purple was offered 4 medallions, all from the Blue team)
 Green, Orange, and Pink were the only teams to be eliminated at The Cave of Karma on the first visit.

References

External links 
 Karma on HBO Max
 

2020s American children's game shows
2020s American reality television series
2020 American television series debuts
American children's adventure television series
American children's reality television series
English-language television shows
HBO Max original programming
Television series about teenagers
Television shows filmed in California